Margaret M. "Peg" McCarthy (born August 21, 1958) is an American neuroscientist and pharmacologist. She is the James & Carolyn Frenkil Endowed Dean's Professor at the University of Maryland School of Medicine, where she is also Professor and Chair of the Department of Pharmacology. She is known for her research on the neuroscience of sex differences and their underlying mechanisms. In 2019, she received the Gill Transformative Investigator Award from the Gill Center for Biomolecular Science at Indiana University.

Education 
McCarthy received a Bachelor of Science and Master of Arts in Biology from the University of Missouri in 1981 and 1984.  She then attended Rutgers University where she received a PhD. in Behavioral Neuroscience in 1989.  Following her PhD., she completed a postdoctoral fellowship with Rockefeller University, where she studied Neurobiology. She completed a fellowship at the National Institutes of Health in Neurogenetics in 1993.

Awards, honors, and affiliations 

 Researcher of the Year, University of Maryland Baltimore (2016) 
 Advisory Board Member, eNeuro, (2015–Present)

References

External links
Faculty page

Living people
1958 births
American women neuroscientists
American neuroscientists
University of Maryland School of Medicine faculty
University of Missouri alumni
Rutgers University alumni
American pharmacologists
Women pharmacologists
21st-century American women scientists
20th-century American women scientists